This was the third season of the new Russian Professional Rugby League,

Table

2007
2007 in Russian rugby union
2007 rugby union tournaments for clubs
2007–08 in European rugby union leagues
2006–07 in European rugby union leagues